Sophie Sugar is a trance musical artist and producer who has established herself as an international DJ. She is currently signed by Armada Music.

Discography
 Call of Tomorrow, Galactive (2005)
 Isis, ETCR (2006)
 Sense of Connection, A State of Trance (2007)
 Fallen Too Far, A State of Trance (2007)
 In This Life, A State of Trance (2007)
 Day Seven, A State of Trance (2007)
 Redemption, A State of Trance (2008)
 Beside You, Armada (2009)
 Together, A State of Trance (2009)
 Skyline (2010)
 Sophie Sugar vs Sunlounger, Lost Together (AVB Mashup) (2010)
 All For You, A State of Trance (2010)
 Freefall 'Skydive' – Sophie Sugar 2011 Re-work (2011)
 Sophie Sugar & Tom Colontonio, Arlanda (2011)

See also
 Armada Music

References

External links
 
 Sophie Sugar Twitter
 Sophie Sugar at Podomatic
 Sophie Sugar at Soundcloud
 
 Armada Music

Living people
Armada Music artists
Club DJs
Remixers
Year of birth missing (living people)